Arne Gabius (born 22 March 1981 in Hamburg) is a German long distance runner. He is the current men's German national record holder in the marathon with his time of 2 hours 08 minutes and 33 seconds.

International competitions

References 

 

1981 births
Living people
Athletes from Hamburg
German national athletics champions
German male long-distance runners
German male marathon runners
Olympic male long-distance runners
Olympic athletes of Germany
Athletes (track and field) at the 2012 Summer Olympics
World Athletics Championships athletes for Germany
European Athletics Championships medalists
21st-century German people